This is a list of association football clubs located in Cameroon.
For a complete list see :Category:Football clubs in Cameroon

A
Abakwa Boys
Aigle Royal Menoua
Aigle Royal de Moungo
Ajax Lions FC Likomba 
Akam Sports Academy
Aljazeera Sports Academy Muyuka
AS Lausanne de Yaoundé
AS Matelots
AS Dobgima
AS Mbaku kulvert

B
Bafmeng United
F.C. Bamenda
Bang Bullet
Benakuma FC
Best Stars Academy
Bamboutos
Buea United

C
Caïman Douala
Canon Yaoundé
Coton Sport FC de Garoua

D
Danay FC
Destiny Restoration
Diamant Yaoundé
Donga United
Douala Athletic Club
Dynamo de Douala
Dream Soccer Academy

E
Espérance Guider
Eteki Esoh Memorial Sport Academy FC

F
Fako United
Family Warriors
Fauve Azur
FC Inter Lion Ngoma
Fédéral Sporting FC du Noun
Foncha Street FC
Fovu Baham
Foudre Sportive d'Akonolinga
Foundation Rapheal Foe FC

H
Hilltop Striker Bamendakwe
Highland Rangers Santa

I
Impôts FC
Isle of Hope Sports Academy

J

K
Kadji Sports Academy
Kilum Mountain FC
Kumba City FC
Kumba Lakers
Kumbo Strikers FC

M
Mount Cameroon F.C.
MAN F.C. D'OBILI

N
New Star de Douala
Ngoketunjia United
Njala Quan Sports Academy
Nkamanyi Football Initiatives
Nso United

O
Olympic Mvolyé
Oryx Douala

P
Panthère du Ndé
PWD Bamenda

R
Rainbow FC
Racing Club Bafoussam
Renaissance FC de Ngoumou
Rockland FC Belo 
Rush FM FC

S
Sable FC
Sahel FC

T
Tiko United
Tonnerre Yaoundé
Tubah United

U
Union Douala
Unisport Bafang
Université FC de Ngaoundéré

V
Victoria City
Victoria United FC (OPOPO)
Vision Athletics Bamenda 
Vision Sports Bamenda

Order

A total of 36 clubs compete in the top two tiers of the football pyramid, divided as follows:

First Division (Elite One) – 18 clubs
Second Division (Elite Two) – 18 clubs

Below the top two divisions are ten regional leagues contested by a varying number of clubs:
Centre Division (Championnat Régional du Centre) – for clubs in the Centre Region
Littoral Division (Championnat Régional du Littoral) – for clubs in the Littoral Region
South Division (Championnat Régional du Sud) – for clubs in the South Region
Southwest Division (Championnat Régional du Sud-Ouest) – for clubs in the Southwest Region
West Division (Championnat Régional de l'Ouest) – for clubs in the West Region
East Division (Championnat Régional de l'Est) – for clubs in the East Region
Far North Division (Championnat Régional du Extrême-Nord) – for clubs in the Far North Region
Adamawa Division (Championnat Régional de l'Adamaoua) – for clubs in the Adamawa Region
Northwest Division (Championnat Régional du Nord-Ouest) – for clubs in the Northwest Region
North Division (Championnat Régional du Nord) – for clubs in the North Region

First Division: Elite One

Second Division: Elite Two

References

External links
Cameroon 2011–12
Oryx Douala
YOSA & National Polytechnic
Panthère
Union Douala
Tonnerre Kalara Club
Achille FC
Feutcheu FC
Dragon Yaoundé
AS Sanaga FC
Les Astres FC
Luanvi FC
Jeneusse Star FC
Kadji Sports Academy

Cameroon
 
Football clubs
Football clubs